The Complete James Brown Christmas is a compilation album by James Brown. The double album  CD set was released on October 12, 2010, on Hip-O-Select. It comprises all the tracks from James Brown Sings Christmas Songs (1966), A Soulful Christmas (1968), and Hey America (1970) and adds relevant singles and single edits.

Track listing

References

2010 Christmas albums
2010 compilation albums
James Brown compilation albums
Hip-O Records compilation albums
Christmas compilation albums